Wulidian Subdistrict is a subdistrict located on the north side of Fengtai District, Beijing, China. It shares border with Lugouqiao Subdistrict to the northwest, Liuliqiao and Fengtai Subdistricts to the east, Kandan and Wanping Subdistricts to the south.

The subdistrict was created from parts of Fengtai Subdistrict, Lugouqiao Subdistrict and Liuliqiao Subdistrict in 2021.

Administrative divisions 
In 2021, the subdistrict had direct jurisdiction over 16 communities:

Gallery

See also 

 List of township-level divisions of Beijing

References 

Fengtai District
Subdistricts of Beijing